Zsombor Kerekes (born 13 September 1973) is a former Hungarian footballer.

Kerekes was a forward who was born in Senta, Serbia (back then still part of SFR Yugoslavia) and was a member of the Hungarian minority in Serbia. Despite being born in Senta, he grew up in the nearly town Ada, from where was his family descents.

Kerekes started playing as senior for First League of FR Yugoslavia clubs FK Bečej and FK Spartak Subotica. Next, he signed with Debreceni VSC in the 1999–2000 season. He also played for Pécsi MFC before joining Willem II. He scored one of his most memorable goals against the France national team in 2005. Kerekes retired from professional football in December 2009.

National team
Kerekes made his debut on 30 November 2004, in Bangkok against the Slovakian national team.

International matches

External links

1973 births
Living people
People from Senta
Hungarians in Vojvodina
Hungarian footballers
Association football forwards
Hungarian expatriate footballers
Hungary international footballers
OFK Bečej 1918 players
FK Spartak Subotica players
Nagykanizsai SC footballers
Debreceni VSC players
Tianjin Jinmen Tiger F.C. players
Pécsi MFC players
Willem II (football club) players
Yugoslav First League players
Expatriate footballers in Yugoslavia
Hungarian expatriate sportspeople in Yugoslavia
Expatriate footballers in China
Hungarian expatriate sportspeople in China
Expatriate footballers in the Netherlands
Hungarian expatriate sportspeople in the Netherlands
People from Ada, Serbia